The Soo Locks (sometimes spelled Sault Locks but pronounced "soo") are a set of parallel locks, operated and maintained by the United States Army Corps of Engineers, Detroit District, that enable ships to travel between Lake Superior and the lower Great Lakes. They are located on the St. Marys River between Lake Superior and Lake Huron, between the Upper Peninsula of the U.S. state of Michigan and the Canadian province of Ontario. They bypass the rapids of the river, where the water falls . The locks pass an average of 10,000 ships per year, despite being closed during the winter from January through March, when ice shuts down shipping on the Great Lakes. The winter closure period is used to inspect and maintain the locks.

The locks share a name (usually shortened and anglicized as Soo) with the two cities named Sault Ste. Marie, in Ontario and in Michigan, located on either side of the St. Marys River. The Sault Ste. Marie International Bridge between the United States and Canada permits vehicular traffic to pass over the locks. A railroad bridge crosses the St. Marys River just upstream of the highway bridge.

The first locks were opened in 1855. Along with the Erie Canal, constructed in 1824 in central New York State, they were amongst the great infrastructure engineering projects of the antebellum United States. The Soo Locks were designated a National Historic Landmark in 1966.

During World War II, the Soo Locks and the St. Marys River waterway were heavily guarded by U.S. and Canadian forces coordinated by the U.S. Army's Central Defense Command. A one-way German air attack on the locks by forces based in Norway was thought to be possible.

United States locks
The U.S. locks form part of a  canal formally named the St. Marys Falls Canal. The entire canal, including the locks, is owned and maintained by the United States Army Corps of Engineers, which provides free passage. The first iteration of the U.S. Soo Locks was completed in May 1855; it was operated by the state of Michigan until transferred to the U.S. Army in 1881. The first federal lock, the Weitzel Lock, was built in 1881 and was replaced by the MacArthur Lock in 1943. The configuration consists of two parallel lock chambers, each running east to west. Starting at the Michigan shoreline and moving north toward Ontario, these are:

The MacArthur Lock, built in 1943. This is large enough to handle ocean-going vessels ("salties") that must also pass through the smaller locks in the Welland Canal. The first vessel through was the SS Carl D. Bradley.
The Poe Lock, built in 1896. The first vessel to pass through was the U.S. Army Corps of Engineers tug USS Hancock. The lock was re-built in 1968 to accommodate larger ships, after the Saint Lawrence Seaway opened and made passage of such ships possible to the Great Lakes. It can take ships carrying  of cargo. The Poe is the only lock that can handle the large lake freighters used on the upper lakes. The first passage after the rebuild was by the Phillip R. Clarke in 1969.
A new lock is under construction and is slated to be completed by 2030. Groundbreaking for the new lock project was held on June 30, 2009. The lock will be equal in size to the Poe Lock and will provide much needed additional capacity for the large lake freighters. The new lock replaces two locks (Davis Lock and Sabin Lock) which were obsolete and used infrequently. In May 2020, construction on Phase One of the replacement of the Sabin Lock was started. 

North of the new lock is an additional channel with a small hydroelectric plant, which provides electricity for the lock complex.

Engineers Day
The U.S. Army Corps of Engineers, Detroit District, operates the Soo Locks Visitors Center and viewing deck for the public. On the last Friday of every June, the public is allowed to go behind the security fence and cross the lock gates of the U.S. Soo Locks for the annual Engineers Day Open House. During this event, visitors are able to get close enough to touch ships passing through the two regularly operating locks. Other than on that day, because the locks are United States Federal property under command of the U.S. Army Corps of Engineers, unauthorized personnel and civilians are restricted from the locks under threat of fines or imprisonment for trespassing.

Canadian lock

A single small lock is operated on the Canadian side of the Soo. The Canadian lock is used for recreational and tour boats; major shipping traffic uses the U.S. locks.

Gallery

References
33 CFR 207.440
33 CFR 207.441

Further reading

External links

Aerial views
Soo Locks homepage U.S. Army Corps of Engineers Soo Locks page
Web Camera view of the American locks NOTE: This Connection is Untrusted
Animation of how the Soo Locks work.
YouTube video HD video of a ship passing through the MacArthur Lock

Canals in Michigan
Locks of the United States
Locks on the National Register of Historic Places
Great Lakes Waterway
Ship canals
St. Marys River (Michigan–Ontario)
Buildings and structures in Sault Ste. Marie, Michigan
Michigan State Historic Sites
National Historic Landmarks in Michigan
Canals on the National Register of Historic Places in Michigan
Transportation in Chippewa County, Michigan
National Register of Historic Places in Chippewa County, Michigan
Transportation buildings and structures on the National Register of Historic Places in Michigan
Transportation buildings and structures in Michigan
1855 establishments in Michigan
United States Army Corps of Engineers
Canada–United States border